Marvodol Glacier is the 9.3 km long and 3.7 km wide glacier on Fallières Coast in Graham Land, Antarctica. It is situated south of Kashin Glacier, north of Forbes Glacier and east-southeast of Bucher Glacier, flows southwards between Shapkarev Buttress and Rudozem Heights, turns west at Stanhope Towers, and flows into Dogs Leg Fjord.

The glacier is named after the settlement of Marvodol in Western Bulgaria.

Location
British mapping in 1978.

Maps
Antarctic Digital Database (ADD). Scale 1:250000 topographic map of Antarctica. Scientific Committee on Antarctic Research (SCAR). Since 1993, regularly upgraded and updated.
British Antarctic Territory. Scale 1:200000 topographic map. DOS 610 Series, Sheet W 67 66. Directorate of Overseas Surveys, Tolworth, UK, 1978.

References
 Bulgarian Antarctic Gazetteer. Antarctic Place-names Commission. (details in Bulgarian, basic data in English)
 Marvodol Glacier. SCAR Composite Antarctic Gazetteer

External links
 Marvodol Glacier. Copernix satellite image

Bulgaria and the Antarctic
Glaciers of Fallières Coast